Qasim, Qasem or Casim may refer to:

 Qasim (name), a given name of Arabic origin and the name of several people
 Port Qasim, port in Karachi, Pakistan
 Kasım and Casim, respectively the Ottoman Turkish and Romanian names for General Toshevo, a town in northeastern Bulgaria

See also 
 Al-Qasim
 Qasim Khanate, Tatar Kingdom in medieval Russia
 Cacém (disambiguation), a Portuguese toponym derived from Qasim
 Kasim (disambiguation)
 Kazem or Kazim, given names
 Qasymbek, a given name